Melanchroia chephise, the white-tipped black or snowbush spanworm, is a moth of the  family Geometridae. It is found from Florida and Texas, south to Paraguay. Strays have been recorded from Arizona, Oklahoma, Arkansas, Kansas and Illinois.

The wingspan is about 33 mm. Adults are on wing from September to December.

Larvae feed on Phyllanthaceae species, including Breynia and Phyllanthus.

External links
Images
Bug Guide

Boarmiini
Geometridae of South America
Moths of South America